The Sopranos: Road to Respect is a 2006 video game by American developer 7 Studios based on the HBO series The Sopranos (1999–2007). The game's storyline takes place between the fifth and sixth seasons and centers on Salvatore "Big Pussy" Bonpensiero's illegitimate son, Joey LaRocca, as he makes his way through the family business.

Road to Respect was published by THQ for the PlayStation 2; a version for the Xbox 360 was set for release, but was canceled.

Gameplay
The player is able to take missions from the main characters of the series at certain points in the game. Road to Respect differs from other mob-influenced games in that it is a linear, story-driven action game as opposed to Grand Theft Autos open-world type gameplay. Players are able to play Texas Hold 'Em with members of the family and visit Bada Bing. Unlike the TV show, the game focuses almost exclusively on the Mafia aspect of The Sopranos rather than the blend of family, business, and therapy to which fans of The Sopranos are accustomed.

Story
The game begins with Tony Soprano offering Salvatore "Big Pussy" Bonpensiero's son Joey LaRocca (the player character) a place in the Mafia. During his first job, he accidentally kills Mario Buscetta, the nephew of Angelo Buscetta. Angelo is the boss of the Philadelphia family. Angie sends a hitman to kill Joey, but Joey kills the hitman during a rooftop chase.

A few days later, Tony's son A.J. has a drug deal go bad on him; his partner wasted the drug money, prompting the dealers to kill his partner and steal his dad's car. Joey retrieves the car and kills one of the dealers, only to have the car stolen by Angie's men. While Joey is fearful the theft of Tony's truck may get him whacked, Tony says that A.J. admitted responsibility. Tony has Joey retaliate for the theft by burning down one of Angie's businesses.

A few days later, Angie returns Tony's car, completely wrecked, and containing Joey's girlfriend, Trichelle, beaten and raped. Joey vows vengeance. At the docks, he finds Angie and throws him off of his yacht, killing him.

Through various intervals in the game, Joey is visited by the ghost of his dead father Salvatore, who warns him about some of the trouble ahead. For eliminating the rival boss Angie, Tony makes Joey a new official affiliate of the Soprano clan. Just before the ceremony, Joey is visited one last time by Salvatore, who is not bitter about his son joining the same mobsters who killed him, and only wants the best for him; he is at peace in the great beyond.

Cast
Cast members include James Gandolfini returning as Tony Soprano, Michael Imperioli returning as Christopher Moltisanti, Steven Van Zandt returning as Silvio Dante, Tony Sirico returning as Paulie Gualtieri, Joseph Gannascoli returning as Vito Spatafore, Vincent Pastore returning as Big Pussy Bonpensiero, and Robert Iler returning as A.J. Soprano. The main character Joey LaRocca is voiced by Christian Maelen.

Other noted actors Monica Keena as Trishelle and Robert Costanzo as Angelo Buscetta. Anthony DeSando, who played Brendan Filone on the series, voices an entirely new character as LaRocca's (Maelen) partner in crime, Reggie.

Development
The concept for the game originated from an idea that Sopranos creator David Chase had years earlier in his writing career. Chase described the original idea as "an action/comedy about a regular Joe from nowhere who decides he wants to be in the Mafia and how you go about joining." Despite the connection to his original idea, Chase maintained that it wasn't his idea to develop a Sopranos video game and that HBO executives spearheaded the project. Chase did however oversee Alan Rucker's script for the game to ensure "the characters were true to the characters."

In an interview with MTV around the time of the game's release, David Chase insisted that Road to Respect had little to no connection to the show: "It wasn't my idea to do a game [...] What I didn't want to have happen was that the game and the show bleed together, that any of the stuff in [the show's] story arcs [...] was in the game or had anything to do with the game."

Many actors from the show reprised their roles for the game, lending their voices and likenesses. Christian Maelen, who voiced the new player character Joey LaRocca, was reportedly David Chase's second choice to play the character Christopher Moltisanti.

Making-of documentary 
HBO: The Making of 'The Sopranos: Road to Respect''' is a behind-the-scenes documentary that aired on HBO in 2006; the hour-long special includes previews of Road to Respect, cast and crew interviews, and footage of actors recording their parts for the game.

 Reception 

The game received "generally unfavorable" reviews according to review aggregator Metacritic. The game received poor reviews from gaming websites like GameSpot and IGN, which complained of overly simplistic gameplay, a small and linear game world with little ability to explore, blocky and unappealing graphics, marginal game mechanics, and various clipping and collision detection bugs. The voice acting contributed by Sopranos'' cast members received praise.

References

External links 
 

2006 video games
Action-adventure games
PlayStation 2 games
PlayStation 2-only games
Cancelled PlayStation 3 games
Cancelled Xbox 360 games
Road to Respect
Video games about the illegal drug trade
Video games based on television series
Video games set in New Jersey
Organized crime video games
THQ games
Video games developed in the United States